Early general elections were held in Lesotho on 3 June 2017 to elect all 120 seats of the National Assembly, the lower house of the Parliament. The elections were called more than three years ahead of schedule due to a successful vote of no confidence against the incumbent Prime Minister Pakalitha Mosisili.

Background
After three years out of power, Pakalitha Mosisili returned to office as Prime Minister in the February 2015 general election as leader of the Democratic Congress, defeating Prime Minister Tom Thabane of the All Basotho Convention. However, in November 2016 an agreement was announced between the deputy leader of the Democratic Congress, Monyane Moleleki, and Tom Thabane to remove Mosisili and install Moleleki as Prime Minister. Moleleki was suspended from the Democratic Congress in December 2016 and launched a new party, the Alliance of Democrats, in January 2017.

On 12 February 2017 Thabane returned to Lesotho from self-imposed exile, declaring that Prime Minister Mosisili no longer commanded a parliamentary majority and vowing to oust him in a vote of no confidence. He claimed that he was risking his life by returning.

The new opposition alliance defeated Mosisili in a vote of no confidence on 1 March 2017 and proposed Moleleki as the new Prime Minister; Mosisili, faced with the choice of stepping aside in favor of Moleleki or calling an early election, chose the latter. He advised King Letsie III to dissolve Parliament, and the King did so on 7 March, despite an opposition effort to obstruct the move. It was announced on 13 March that an early election would be held on 3 June 2017.

Electoral system
The 120 members of the National Assembly are elected using the mixed-member proportional representation system, with voters casting a single vote. Eighty members are elected from single-member constituencies by first-past-the-post voting, with the remaining 40 elected from a single nationwide constituency in a closed list as leveling seats. The votes from every constituency are totalled (with votes cast for independent candidates ignored) to give a nationwide total for each party. A quota of the 120 total seats in the National Assembly is then calculated using each party's vote share and the number of seats won in constituencies is deducted in order to give the number of the 40 leveling -seats that a party is due. If the total number of seats due to be awarded is less than 120, the highest remainder method is used to distribute the remaining leveling seats.

Results 
Partial results available by 5 June, with counting for 57 constituencies completed, showed Thabane's opposition party, the ABC, winning 45 constituencies against only eight for Mosisili's party, the Democratic Congress.

Full results were released on 6 June, confirming a victory for Thabane and the ABC, which won 48 seats against 30 for Mosisili's Democratic Congress.

By district

Government formation
The ABC said on 6 June that it planned to form a government in coalition with the Alliance of Democrats, the Basotho National Party, and the Reformed Congress of Lesotho. A government statement on 8 June said that Mosisili had submitted his resignation to King Letsie but would continue in a caretaker capacity. However, on 9 June, Deputy Prime Minister Mothetjoa Metsing, leader of the Lesotho Congress for Democracy, said that "there is no need for the removal of the existing government in office" and argued for the formation of "a government of national unity" for the sake of national stability.

Thabane's estranged wife Dipolelo was shot and killed on 14 June. Thabane was sworn in as Prime Minister on 16 June, and his cabinet was sworn in on 23 June, including Monyane Moleleki as Deputy Prime Minister and Minister of Parliamentary Affairs.

References

External links
IEC Lesotho

Lesotho
General
Elections in Lesotho
Lesotho